Facundo Bagnis was the defending champion but lost in the quarterfinals.
Adrian Ungur won the Romanian final against Marius Copil 6–4, 7–6(7–3).

Seeds

Draw

Finals

Top half

Bottom half

References
 Main Draw
 Qualifying Draw

BRD Arad Challengerandnbsp;- Singles
2013 Singles